Gbofesso-Sama (also spelled Bofesso-Sama) is a village in western Ivory Coast. It is in the sub-prefecture of Sandougou-Soba, Man Department, Tonkpi Region, Montagnes District.

Gbofesso-Sama was a commune until March 2012, when it became one of 1126 communes nationwide that were abolished.

Notes

Former communes of Ivory Coast
Populated places in Montagnes District
Populated places in Tonkpi